Tetrapollinia is a genus of flowering plants belonging to the family Gentianaceae.

Its native range is Southern Tropical America.

Species:

Tetrapollinia caerulescens

References

Gentianaceae
Gentianaceae genera